The 1998 Canadian Professional Soccer League season was the inaugural season under the Canadian Professional Soccer League name. The season began on May 31, 1998, and concluded on October 14, 1998, with the St. Catharines Wolves defeating the Toronto Olympians in 4-2 victory in a penalty shootout to claim the first CPSL Championship held at Centennial Park Stadium in Toronto, Ontario. Though Toronto was denied the treble they still managed to go undefeated the entire regular season, and dominate the league with the best offensive and defensive record.

The CPSL was created by an alliance forged by the Ontario Soccer Association with the Canadian National Soccer League in order to implement the Image of the Game Report to provide a suitable professional soccer structure in Ontario and potentially throughout the country for the development of players and to serve as a preliminary league for the North American top tier leagues. During the initial stages of the formation of the league it faced certain difficulties as the schedule was finalized just two weeks prior kickoff. The scheduling problem revolved mainly around the status of Toronto Italia as it disagreed with the league's policy and territory rights. Though they applied for membership it was challenged by Toronto Croatia over alleged debts being owned to them from the 1995 CNSL season. After refusing to pay the debt Italia withdrew and were refunded of its membership application fee, as a result the CPSL lost one of the country's most prestige clubs. In addition the league received sponsorship from Adidas, Labatt, and Coffee Time.

Overview

Origins and foundation (1993–98) 
After the demise of the Canadian Soccer League in 1992 Canada was without a Division I national professional league. The Canadian soccer landscape was fractured into several different foreign and regional senior leagues. When the CSL ceased operations three of their clubs the Vancouver Whitecaps, Toronto Blizzard, and Montreal Supra joined the American Professional Soccer League, which at the time was constituted as the highest tier league in the Canadian soccer structure. While the remaining clubs with the exception of London Lasers joined the National Soccer League the country's oldest and only exclusively Canadian professional league. After the addition of the Winnipeg Fury it changed its name to the Canadian National Soccer League.

Though the CNSL was primarily based in Ontario it operated as a private league for several years after a heated dispute with the Ontario Soccer Association. While other provinces operated with a top senior amateur league Ontario had its own senior league, but was without a sanctioned professional league for its amateur players as the CNSL was considered an outlaw league by the OSA. As a result the OSA completed a study named the Image of the Game in 1995/1996, which led to the plans of launching the Ontario Professional Soccer League as a Division III league in the Canadian soccer league system. As the OSA failed to bring their project to fruition they settled their differences with the CNSL and formed an alliance to launch the Canadian Professional Soccer League beginning with an Ontario division.

The CPSL would serve as the link between the provincial senior leagues to the USL A-League/USISL clubs, and provide opportunities for the development of youth players and referees. The intention of the league was to form regional divisions under the CPSL banner with each divisional champion competing in a playoff format for the championship. Michael Di Biase the CNSL president would serve as the commissioner, and OSA administrator Bill Spiers was named the league's chairman. The founding members included four CNSL clubs London City, North York Astros, St. Catharines Wolves, Toronto Croatia, and four of the OPSL teams Glen Shields, Mississauga Eagles, Toronto Olympians, and York Region Shooters. While the remaining CNSL teams like Toronto Italia, Toronto Supra, and Kosovo Albanians failed in successfully applying for membership.

Organization

Regulations 
The Canadian Professional Soccer League was formed as a result of merger between the OSA stillborn Ontario Professional Soccer League with the Canadian National Soccer League. The original purpose of the alliance was to provide young players an opportunity to embark on a professional career. Originally operated in Ontario with the intention of expanding nationally with a similar provincial setup. Some of these regulations included:
 Rosters must have 5 U-20 Canadian players per club.
 Starting 11 must include a minimum of 2 U-20 players.
 Minimum of a Coaching C License

Teams

Final standings

Rogers Cup playoffs

Bracket

Semifinals

Toronto Olympians advanced to the semi-final as a result of a 2-0 forfeit.

CPSL Championship

Season statistics

Goals 
Full article: CSL Golden Boot

Hat-tricks

CPSL Executive Committee 
The 1998 CPSL Executive Committee.

Individual awards  

The CPSL presented their inaugural team awards on December 18, 1998 at the Soccer Centre in Woodbridge, Ontario. The majority of the awards were taken by the former CNSL teams with North York Astros, St. Catharines Wolves, and London City receiving four awards. While the Toronto Olympians with London City won the most awards with two wins. After leading the Olympians to an undefeated regular season David Gee was named the Coach of the Year. The regular season champions had Gus Kouzmanis the 1996 CNSL Rookie of the Year win the Golden Boot. For the third straight season London City managed to produce another Rookie of the Year with Tom Bianchi, and win the Fair Play award for being the most disciplined team..

The remainder of the awards went to North York, and St. Catharines with former CNSL veterans Dino Perri, and Rene Martin taking home the Goalkeeper and MVP awards. The league also gave recognition to the best official by introducing the Referee of the Year award with Bill Teeuwen being its first recipient.

References

External links
Rocket Robin's Home Page of the 1998 CSL Season  --Season preview 
Rocket Robin's Home Page of the 1998 CSL Season
RSSSF CPSL page

1998
1998 domestic association football leagues
Canadian Professional Soccer League